Chhatak is an upazila of the Sunamganj District, located in the northeastern Sylhet Division of Bangladesh. It is named after its headquarters, the town of Chhatak, which is an important industrial centre in the division. Although it is currently part of the Sunamganj District, Chhatak is more closely related to Sylhet District for social, cultural, commercial and transport reasons.

Etymology
According to the majority of researchers including Dewan Mohammad Azraf, the area got its name from chhātā, the Bengali word for umbrella. It is said that upon the founding of a haat bazaar in such a rain-prone area, shopkeepers and shoppers would arrive with umbrellas and use umbrellas to prevent rain from falling on their fruits and crops. The area would be filled with umbrellas which later caused the market to be known as Chhātār Bazār (Umbrella's Market). Over time, it became corrupted into Chhātak Bazār. On the other hand, Monir Uddin Chowdhury asserted that Chhātak was actually corrupted from Chhatrāk, the word for an umbrella holder. He added that the area was first settled by a group of Chhatrāks who used to serve the local ruler.

History
After the Conquest of Srihatta in 1303, some disciples of Shah Jalal migrated and settled in present-day Chhatak where they preached Islam to the local people. Syed Yusuf of Iraq migrated to a village in Singchapor pargana which came to be known as Syedergaon (The Syed's village) and continue to be the residence of his descendants.

In 1788, Ganga Singha initiated a rebellion in Chhatak against the British East India Company. Company soldiers managed to capture Singha, who later committed suicide by drowning himself in a river. A thana was founded in Chhatak in 1908, during the British Raj period. During the Bangladesh Liberation War of 1971, Bengali freedom fighters in Chhatak immersed themselves in a brawl on 28 April, leading to the death of 13 freedom fighters with 11 being wounded. Hader Tila and Durbin Tila were also battlegrounds during the war. In memory of Chhatak's contribution, the Chhatak Central Memorial Monument as well as the Seventeen Flames in Madhabpur were established following the war. In 1976, Chhatak was divided into three thanas; Chhatak, Dowarabazar and Companiganj. In 1980, the Jalalia Alim Madrasa was founded in Chhatak which developed local Islamic education. Three years later, Chhatak Thana was upgraded to an upazila (sub-district) as part of the President of Bangladesh Hussain Muhammad Ershad's decentralisation programme. A movement emerged among the people of Chhatak to transfer the upazila to Sylhet for cultural, social, commercial and transport reasons. As a result, the demand reached the Committee for Administrative Reorganisation but was not implemented for various reasons. From 1984, a movement demanding the creation of Chhatak District emerged; which would consist of Chhatak, Dowarabazar, Companiganj and the proposed upazilas of Jauwabazar and Jahidpur (South Chhatak). The movement gained the support of Chhataki politicians such as Shamsu Miah Chowdhury (MPA), Idris Ali Bir Pratik (Chairman of Dowarabazar) and Madaris Ali (Chairman of Companiganj). In 2020, a group of Chhataki lawyers submitted a memorandum to Muhammad Mashiur Rahman NDC, the Sylhet Divisional Commissioner, demanding the establishment of Chhatak District.

Geography

It has 43,727 households and a total area 434.76 km2.

Demographics
At the time of the 1991 Bangladesh census, Chhatak had a population of 273,153. Males constituted 51.05% of the population and females 48.95%. The adult (18+) population was 135,445. Religious affiliation was: Muslim 83.08%, Hindu 16.75%, Buddhist, Christian and others 0.17%.

Administration
Chhatak Upazila is divided into Chhatak Municipality and 13 union parishads: Bhatgaon, Chhaila Afjalabad, Chhatak, Chormoholla, Dolarbazar, Gobindganj-Syedergaon, Islampur, Jauwa Bazar, Kalaruka, Khurma Dakshin, Khurma Uttar, Noarai, and Singchapair. The union parishads are subdivided into 287 mauzas and 539 villages.

Chhatak Municipality is subdivided into 9 wards and 23 mahallas.

Municipality
The Upazila Municipality consists of 9 wards:

Ward 1: 
Ward 2: 
Ward 3: 
Ward 4: 
Ward 5: 
Ward 6: 
Ward 7: 
Ward 8: 
Ward 9:

Chairmen

Education
Chhatak has an average literacy rate of 24.5% (7+ years) compared with the national average of 32.4%.

Notable people
Abdul Hoque, freedom fighter and politician
Abul Hasnat Md. Abdul Hai, former parliamentarian
Kalim Uddin Ahmed, BNP politician
Mohibur Rahman Manik, Awami League politician
Durbin Shah, mystical poet and songwriter

See also
Chhatak
Upazilas of Bangladesh
Districts of Bangladesh
Divisions of Bangladesh
Khola Gaon
Mahammedpur
Jhigli
Haydor Pur

References

 
Upazilas of Sunamganj District